The Church of St. John the Baptist was a historic church building in Virginia, Minnesota, United States.  It was built in 1924 by a Polish American congregation of Roman Catholics.  In 1980 the church was listed on the National Register of Historic Places under the name Church of St. John the Baptist (Catholic) for its local significance in the themes of religion and social history.  It was nominated for serving as the center of religious and social life for Virginia's Polish Americans.

The parish moved to a new building on the same block, the Holy Spirit Catholic Church, in the 1970s.  The Church of St. John, little used for years, was demolished in December 2018 to make room for a playground and expanded parking lot for the adjacent parochial school.

Description
The red brick structure contains Gothic Revival elements, with six arched windows on each of the sides and arched windows flanking the main entrance.  The steeple above the main entrance has Jacobean styling.

History
The church was built in 1924 and became the center of religious and social life for the Polish immigrants in the city of Virginia.  It was consecrated by the first Polish bishop in the United States, Paul Peter Rhode.  The church was also used by nonreligious Polish organizations, including the Polish National Alliance.

See also
 List of Catholic churches in the United States
 National Register of Historic Places listings in St. Louis County, Minnesota

References

1924 establishments in Minnesota
Buildings and structures demolished in 2018
Churches in St. Louis County, Minnesota
Churches in the Roman Catholic Diocese of Duluth
Churches on the National Register of Historic Places in Minnesota
Demolished buildings and structures in Minnesota
Demolished churches in the United States
Former Roman Catholic church buildings in Minnesota
Gothic Revival church buildings in Minnesota
National Register of Historic Places in St. Louis County, Minnesota
Polish-American culture in Minnesota
Roman Catholic churches completed in 1924
20th-century Roman Catholic church buildings in the United States